Parahygrobia natans is an extinct species of adephagan beetle. It is the only member of the genus Parahygrobia and family Parahygrobiidae. It is known only from larvae from the Late Jurassic of Russia. Cladistic analysis has placed it as the sister group to extant Hygrobiidae.

References

Adephaga
†